Fox Hill Plantation is a historic plantation house located near Lively, Lancaster County, Virginia.  It was built about 1820, and is a two-story, five bay, "L"-shaped brick dwelling with a hipped roof. It is a variation of the "I-house". Also on the property are the contributing two-story, three-bay brick kitchen and pyramidal-roofed smokehouse.

It was listed on the National Register of Historic Places in 1978.

References

Plantation houses in Virginia
Houses on the National Register of Historic Places in Virginia
Houses completed in 1820
Houses in Lancaster County, Virginia
National Register of Historic Places in Lancaster County, Virginia